The 1971 Cal State Hayward Pioneers football team represented California State College at Hayward—now known as California State University, East Bay—as a member of the Far Western Conference (FWC) during the 1971 NCAA College Division football season. Led by first-year head coach Bob Rodrigo, Cal State Hayward compiled an overall record of 7–2–1 with a mark of 3–2–1 in conference play, placing third in the FWC. The team outscored its opponents 272 to 185 for the season. The Pioneers played home games at Pioneer Stadium in Hayward, California.

Schedule

Notes

References

Cal State Hayward
Cal State Hayward Pioneers football seasons
Cal State Hayward Pioneers football